Jessica Kelsey Amlee (born July 17, 1994) is a Canadian television and film actress known for playing Mallory on the television series Heartland. She also appeared as Amy in the thriller-horror film Beneath and Jackie Sanders in Greenhouse Academy on Netflix.

Filmography

Film

Television

References

External links
 

Canadian child actresses
Canadian film actresses
Canadian television actresses
Canadian voice actresses
Living people
People from Maple Ridge, British Columbia
Actresses from British Columbia
21st-century Canadian actresses
1994 births